Lucía Castañeda Gomez (born 8 July 1981) is a weightlifter who competed for Nicaragua at the 2012 Summer Olympics in Women's 63kg. She would finish 9th in the event.

References 

1981 births
Olympic weightlifters of Nicaragua
Weightlifters at the 2012 Summer Olympics
Living people
Nicaraguan female weightlifters
Sportspeople from Managua